Harvey Robert Miller (March 1, 1933 – April 27, 2015) was an American lawyer. The New York Times called him "the most prominent bankruptcy lawyer in the nation." Born in New York City, Miller graduated from Brooklyn College (A.B., 1954) and Columbia University (LL.B., 1959), and was admitted to the bar in New York State in 1959.

Miller was a partner in the New York City based international law firm of Weil, Gotshal & Manges, LLP where he was a member of the firm's management committee for over 25 years and created and developed the firm's Business Finance & Restructuring department specializing in reorganizing distressed business entities. From September 2002 to March 2007, he was a managing director and vice chairman of Greenhill & Co., a boutique investment bank.

Miller's crowning achievement was his representation of the estate in the bankruptcy of Lehman Brothers. He died in 2015 of amyotrophic lateral sclerosis, aged 82.

References

Further reading

1933 births
2015 deaths
Brooklyn College alumni
Columbia Law School alumni
Lehman Brothers people
New York (state) lawyers
People from Gravesend, Brooklyn
Neurological disease deaths in New York (state)
Deaths from motor neuron disease
20th-century American lawyers
21st-century American lawyers